Wanderley Vallim da Silva (12 August 1936 – 9 July 2022) was a Brazilian entrepreneur and politician. A member of the Brazilian Labour Party, he served as governor of the Federal District from 1990 to 1991.

Vallim died in Brasília on 9 July 2022 at the age of 85.

References

1936 births
2022 deaths
20th-century Brazilian businesspeople
21st-century Brazilian businesspeople
Governors of the Federal District (Brazil)
Brazilian Labour Party (current) politicians
Federal University of Rio de Janeiro alumni
People from Ituverava